The following is a timeline of the history of the city of Wheeling, West Virginia, US.

18th century

 1769 – Wheeling founded by Ebenezer Zane.
 1774 – Fort Fincastle built.
 1777 – September: Siege of Fort Henry "by a large force of Indians."
 1782 – September: Attempted siege on fort by "about 40 British regular soldiers and about 250 Indians."
 1793 – Town grid laid out.
 1795 – Town incorporated.
 1797 – Wheeling becomes seat of Ohio County.
 1798 – Shepherd Hall (residence) built.

19th century
 1806 – George Miller becomes town mayor.
 1807 – Wheeling Library Company founded.
 1814 – Linsly Institute for boys founded.
 1817 – Elm Grove Stone Arch Bridge built.
 1818
 National Road begins operating.
 Va. North-Western Gazette newspaper begins publication.
 1821 – Glass manufacturing begins.
 1834 – Wheeling Water Works established.
 1836
 City chartered.
 Moses W. Chapline becomes city mayor.
 1840 – Population: 7,885.
 1848 – Wheeling Female Academy and Wheeling Lyceum established.
 1849
 Wheeling Suspension Bridge opens.
 Nail manufacturing begins.
 1850
 Roman Catholic Diocese of Wheeling established.
 Population: 11,435.
 1852 – Baltimore and Ohio Railroad built.
 1853
 Wheeling Hospital established.
 Iron Market House in business.
 1859 – Wheeling Library Association established.
 1860 – Population: 14,083.
 1861
 January: Andrew J. Sweeney becomes mayor.
 May: First Wheeling Convention held.
 June: Second Wheeling Convention held.
 1863
 June 20
 Wheeling becomes capitol of the new state of West Virginia.
 West Virginia Legislature convenes.
 Daily Register newspaper begins publication.
 1865 – St. Joseph's Academy for girls established.
 1866 – Greenwood Cemetery established.
 1870
 West Virginia capitol relocated from Wheeling to Charleston.
 Population: 19,280.
 1875 – Wheeling becomes capitol of West Virginia again.
 1879 – Bloch Brothers in business.
 1880 – Population: 30,737.
 1882 – Wheeling Public Library established.
 1883 – Soldiers and Sailors Monument dedicated.
 1884 – Ohio River flood.
 1885 – West Virginia capitol relocated from Wheeling to Charleston again.
 1890
 City Hospital established.
 Population: 34,522.
 1897 – Cathedral Parish School built.
 1898 – March 26: Ohio River flood.
 1900 – Population: 38,878.

20th century

 1904 – Victoria Theater in business.
 1907 – March 15: Ohio River flood.
 1910 – Population: 41,641.
 1913 – March 28: Ohio River flood.
 1915 – Rex Theater in business.
 1917 – Liberty Theatre in business.
 1922 – Lincoln Theater in business.
 1926
 WWVA radio begins broadcasting.
 Wheeling Area Historical Society founded.
 1928
 Oglebay Park established.
 Madonna of the Trail monument dedicated.
 Capitol Theatre in business.
 1929 – Wheeling Country Day School incorporated.
 1930 – Oglebay Institute established.
 1933 – Ohio County Public Library active.
 1935 – Wheeling News-Register newspaper in publication.
 1936
 March 19: Ohio River flood.
 City centennial.
 1937 – January 26: Ohio River flood of 1937.
 1942 – December 21: Ohio River flood.
 1950 – February 9, 1950: Senator Joseph R. McCarthy made the "Enemies Within" speech before the Ohio County Women’s Republican Club
 1952 – October 23: US president Truman visits city during election campaign.
 1953 – WTRF-TV (television) begins broadcasting.
 1955 – Fort Henry Bridge and Jesuit Wheeling College open.
 1970 – Wheeling Area Genealogical Society founded.
 1976 – Wheeling Park High School established.
 1977 – Oglebay's Good Zoo established.
 1983 – Alan Mollohan becomes U.S. representative for West Virginia's 1st congressional district.

21st century

 2008 – Andy McKenzie becomes mayor.
 2010 – Population: 28,486 city; 147,950 metro.
 2011 – David McKinley becomes U.S. representative for West Virginia's 1st congressional district.
 2016 – Glenn Elliott elected mayor.

See also
 Wheeling, West Virginia history
 List of mayors of Wheeling, West Virginia
 National Register of Historic Places listings in Ohio County, West Virginia
 Other cities in West Virginia:
 Timeline of Charleston, West Virginia
 Timeline of Huntington, West Virginia

References

Bibliography

published in 19th c.

published in 20th c.
 
 
 Charles A. Wingerter. History of Greater Wheeling and Vicinity. Chicago: Lewis Publishing Company, 1912.
 
 
  + chronology
 
Minder, Mike. Wheeling’s Gambling History to 1976. Wheeling: Nail City Publishing, 1997.

published in 21st c.
Fones-Wolf, Ken, “‘Traitors in Wheeling’: Secessionism in an Appalachian Unionist City,” Journal of Appalachian Studies, 13 (Spring–Fall 2007), 75–95. .
Duffy, Sean, & Rinkes, Paul, Wheeling: Then & Now. Mount Pleasant, S. Carolina: Arcadia Publishing, 2010.

External links

 
 
 Items related to Wheeling, various dates (via Digital Public Library of America).

Wheeling, West Virginia
Wheeling
West Virginia-related lists
wheeling
Years in West Virginia